Edward Roy Scott was a Scottish amateur football forward who made over 150 appearances in the Scottish League for Queen's Park.

References

1897 births
Scottish footballers
Scottish Football League players
Association football outside forwards
Queen's Park F.C. players
Place of death missing
Date of death missing
Association football inside forwards
People from Dennistoun
Year of death missing